Camp Salvation was a refugee camp set up on September 23, 1849 to help those traveling to the California Gold Rush. Emigrants were crossing the harsh Sonoran Desert to get to California through the Southern Emigrant Trail. The camp was located in the current town of Calexico, California. Lieutenant Cave Johnson Couts, an Escort Commander with the International Boundary Commission setup the camp. From September 23 till December 1, 1849, the camp helped travelers on the trail. In June 1849 the United States Boundary Commission arrived in San Diego to survey the international border between United States and Mexico.

California Historical Landmark

A California Historical Marker was setup in 1965 by the California State Park Commission working with City of Calexico and the John P. Squibob with E Clampus Vitus. The marker is at the 400 Block of East 5th Street, Calexico. The California Historical Landmark number 808.

The California Historical Landmark reads:
Marker Number 808, Here on September 23, 1849, Liet. Cave J. Couts, Escourt Commander, International Boundary Commission, established Camp Salvation. From September till the first of December 1849, it served as a refugee center for distressed emigrants attempting to reach the gold fields over the Southern Emigrant Trail.

Lieutenant Cave J. Couts

Cave Johnson Couts was born on November 11, 1821 in Springfield, Tennessee. Much of his education came from his uncle Cave Johnson. His uncle Cave Johnson (1793-1866) was for 14 years a U.S. Congressman from Tennessee and the United States Postmaster General. Cave J. Couts himself became a cadet in West Point Military Academy at 17. He graduated in 1843 and became a second lieutenant of the regiment of Mounted Rifles. He was sent to Fort Jesup in Natchitoches, Louisiana. Then posted to Fort Washita in Durant, Oklahoma called the in Indian Territory then. Then to Fort Gibson departing in 1847. In 1848 he and his men depart to California, arriving on January 9, 1849. The trip across the Sonoran Desert and was very difficult. Couts was the leader of an expedition to the Gila River and was in charge of the Boundary Survey between the United States and Mexico in 1949. Couts set up a post camp at the meeting spot of the Colorado and Gila Rivers. He called the post Camp Calhoun. Along with boundary survey work, he helped with Indian relations and helped '49er emigrants. He was elected as state delegate from San Diego on August 1, 1849, to attend California Constitutional Convention at Monterey in 1849. He set up a refugee camp at the current site of Calexico, California on September 23, 1849 to help those traveling to the California Gold Rush. Couts married Miss Ysidora Bandini (1829-1897) on April 5, 1851. Ysidora was the daughter of Don Juan Bandini of San Diego. Bandini had worked for the Mexican government and was the son of Don Jose Bandini, an admiral in the Spanish Navy. Couts had 10 children. Couts lived on a 2,219 acres Ranch Guajome, near present-day Vista, California. In October 1851 Couts resigned his Army commission and then took an appointed a Colonel in the aide de camp on of Governor John Bigler. At his Ranch Guajome he found that San Diego County soil and climate could grow many types of agriculture crops. Couts was the first in San Diego County to plant vast orchards. After retiring from the Army he lived in old San Diego and became a County Judge. On August 10, 1856 Couts became a special Indian agent for a short time. He checked up on the Indians in San Diego County and wrote of a report on their status to the Honorable Commissioner of Indian Affairs, with suggestions for improvement. At Mission San Luis Rey de Francia area, and Rancho Monserate he became the supervisor of the Indians there. He gave three hundred Indians jobs in construction, building: adobe house, chapel, barns, stables, sheds, corrals and planting flowers, orange and lemon trees.  Couts' ranch did very well and he purchased near by ranches of Rancho Vallecitos de San Marcos in 1866, Rancho Buena Vista in 1866 and La Jolla. At its peak his ranch was 20,000 acres. He lost much with the passage of the no fence law of 1874.  He had to sell much of his livestock at a sacrifice. He died on July 10, 1874 at the home of the Horton's House in San Diego.

The Couts home Rancho Guajome Adobe has been saved and is now a California Historical Landmark and on the National Register of Historic Places. It is located on the Guajome Regional Park in Vista California.

See also

California Historical Landmarks in Imperial County
 Yuma War - US battles
Imperial County
Imperial Valley
Calexico–Mexicali

References

California Historical Landmarks
History of Yuma County, Arizona
Sonoran Desert